The Diocese of Wangaratta is a diocese of the Anglican Church of Australia. It is situated in the north-eastern part of the state of Victoria, Australia. Its geographic remit includes the cities of Wangaratta, Albury-Wodonga and Shepparton. The cathedral is the church of the Holy Trinity in Wangaratta. The diocese was erected in 1902, when Thomas Henry Armstrong was installed as the first Bishop of Wangaratta. The current bishop is Clarence Bester who was enthroned in 2020.

History
The diocese was founded in 1902. 

In 2019, the diocese voted in favour of a motion authorizing a blessing rite for same-sex unions. In November of 2020, the Appellate Tribunal, the church's highest court, ruled that a diocese may authorize blessing rites for same-sex unions, allowing the Wangaratta motion to go into effect.

Cathedral

The cathedral church of the diocese is Holy Trinity Cathedral, Wangaratta. The land on which the church is built was donated to the parish by William Henry Clark, a pioneer of Wangaratta. The foundation stone was laid in 1908 by Bishop Arthur Green, the Bishop of Ballarat, and was dedicated on 24 August 1909. A second section was built between 1922 and 1924. The building was faced in locally quarried granite to a design by the English architect Walter Butler. The baptistery, designed by the church architect Louis Williams, was completed in 1965.

The cathedral houses eight change ringing bells. Cast in 1806 by John Rudhall, they are the oldest "complete" ring of bells in Australia. They were originally housed in St. George's Church, Bolton, and were first rung in 1987 once a tower had been built to house them. The current organ was built in 1902 by Henry Willis & Sons and is the fourth instrument to be housed in the cathedral.

Deans of Holy Trinity, Wangaratta
The Rector of the Parish of the Holy Trinity, Wangaratta (the cathedral parish), is designated as Dean of Holy Trinity Cathedral.

 1965–1972: Robert Beal (later Bishop of Wangaratta, 1985)
 1972 - 1989: David Laurie Thawley
 1989 - 1995:  Donald McMonigle
 1995- 2003: Ray McInnes 
 2003 - 2013: Michael O'Brien
 2014–present: Ken Goodger

Bishops of Wangaratta

References

External links 
 Official website

Anglican bishops of Wangaratta
Wangaratta
Wangaratta
1902 establishments in Australia
Wangaratta
Gothic Revival church buildings in Australia